In the Company of Men is a 1997 Canadian–American black comedy film, written and directed by Neil LaBute and starring Aaron Eckhart, Matt Malloy, and Stacy Edwards. The film, which was adapted from a play written by LaBute, and served as his feature film debut, won him the Independent Spirit Award for Best First Screenplay.

The film revolves around two male co-workers, Chad and Howard, who, angry and frustrated with women in general, plot to toy maliciously with the emotions of a deaf female subordinate. It was first written as a play, which debuted at Brigham Young University in December 1992, and received a 1993 Drama AML Award from the Association for Mormon Letters.

Plot
Chad and Howard are two middle management employees at a corporation, temporarily assigned to a branch office away from home for six weeks. Embittered by bad experiences with women, Chad and Howard form a mean-spirited revenge scheme to find an insecure woman, romance her simultaneously, and then break up with her at the same time. Chad is the originator and driving force behind the scheme, while Howard is the more passive of the two, which leads to a later conflict with the scheme.

Chad decides upon Christine, a deaf co-worker who is so self-conscious that she wears headphones so people, thinking that she is listening to music, are compelled to get her attention visually without immediately learning that she is deaf. Chad and Howard decide to each ask her out, and over the course of several weeks, date her simultaneously.

In the meantime, things with the project go wrong; a fax Chad is supposed to have made to the home office is "lost" and a presentation Chad is supposed to deliver to the home office is unable to be carried out successfully after some documents are allegedly printed so lightly that they are illegible. These mishaps culminate in Howard being demoted and Chad taking his place as the head of the project after Chad places the blame for the mishaps unfairly on Howard. Chad eventually sleeps with Christine, and she falls in love with him. When Christine eventually breaks this news to Howard, Howard tells Christine the truth about their scheme, and tells her that he loves her. Christine is shocked by the revelation, and refuses to believe that Chad would do this. When she confronts Chad, he admits the truth. Christine angrily slaps Chad, but Chad is unashamed of his behavior, and cruelly taunts Christine, who collapses into tears after he leaves her.

Weeks later, Howard confronts Chad back home at his apartment. Howard is now apparently in the bad graces of the company, having been moved to a lower floor, while Chad is doing well, and thus offering to say something on Howard's behalf. Nevertheless, Howard is not worried about work; he confesses to Chad that he really loved Christine. At this point Chad, despite having previously told Howard that his girlfriend, Suzanne, had left him, shows Howard that she is still there, asleep in his bed. Chad says that he carried out the plan "because I could," and cruelly asks Howard how it feels to have truly hurt someone. Howard, who had never done anything like that before, leaves, horrified.

Howard later travels back to the city and to a bank where he sees Christine working, and tries to speak to her, but she looks away in anger. He loudly pleads with her to "listen" to him, but his pleas literally fall on deaf ears.

Cast
 Aaron Eckhart as Chad
 Matt Malloy as Howard
 Stacy Edwards as Christine 
 Mark Rector as John
 Jason Dixie as Intern

Themes
In the Company of Men features several themes such as retro-sexism and role reversals. An example of role reversal is that in the beginning Howard plans with Chad to destroy an innocent young woman, yet by the end of the film Chad has "destroyed" Howard.

Reception

Box office
In the Company of Men opened in a limited release in 8 theaters on August 1, 1997, and grossed $100,006, with an average of $12,500 per theater. The film's widest release was 108 theaters and it ended up earning $2,804,473.

Critical response
In the Company of Men was screened in the Un Certain Regard section at the 1997 Cannes Film Festival. The film received very positive reviews from critics and has a "certified fresh" score of 89% on Rotten Tomatoes based on 54 reviews with an average rating of 7.9 out of 10. The critical consensus states "Neil LaBute's pitch-black comedy is a masterful exploration of male insecurity, and it's elevated by a breakout performance by Aaron Eckhart as a businessman who likes to play psychological games." The film also has a score of 81 out of 100 on Metacritic based on 25 critics indicating "universal acclaim". In January 1998, it was included on Siskel and Ebert's "Best Films of 1997" episode.

The character of Chad was also nominated by the American Film Institute for their list of AFI's 100 Years...100 Heroes and Villains, but did not make it into the top 100. It was listed on Empire's 500 Greatest films of all time at number 493.

Accolades

Home media
The DVD of the film contains two commentary tracks, one with director Neil LaBute, and the other with stars Aaron Eckhart, Matt Malloy, and Stacy Edwards.

See also

List of films featuring the deaf and hard of hearing

References

External links
 
 
 

1992 plays
1997 films
1997 comedy films
1997 directorial debut films
1990s black comedy films
1990s buddy comedy films
1990s English-language films
English-language Canadian films
Alliance Atlantis films
1997 independent films
American black comedy films
American buddy comedy films
American films based on plays
American Sign Language films
Films about deaf people
Films about sexual harassment
Films directed by Neil LaBute
Films set in Indiana
Films shot in Indiana
Plays by Neil LaBute
Sony Pictures Classics films
Sundance Film Festival award winners
1990s American films